Davidson is a highly selective independent liberal arts college for 1,900 students located 20 minutes north of Charlotte in Davidson, North Carolina, United States. Since its establishment in 1837 by Presbyterians, the college has graduated 23 Rhodes Scholars and is consistently regarded as one of the top liberal arts colleges in the country. Through the Davidson Trust, the college became the first liberal arts institution in the nation to replace loans with grants in all financial aid packages, giving all students the opportunity to graduate debt-free.

The following is a list of notable people associated with Davidson College.

Notable alumni

Arts, film, theatre, and broadcasting
 Roxanne Beckford, actress
 Michael Brun, DJ
 Zachery Byrd, actor
 Rod Daniel, director
 Donald Davis, storyteller
 Craig Detweiler, screenwriter, cultural commentator
 Bertis Downs IV, manager of R.E.M.
 Ervin Duggan, president of PBS
 Kenan Ece, Turkish actor
 McNair Evans, photographer
 William R. Ferris, Chairman of the National Endowment for the Humanities, 1997–2001; founding director, Center for the Study of Southern Culture
 John T. Fesperman, conductor and organist
Dan Gervacio, Magic Magazine's "Man of Mystery, 2019"
 Frank Gohlke, photographer (attended, but later transferred to The University of Texas at Austin)
 Elijah Gowin, photographer and Guggenheim Fellow
 James Harding, British journalist
 Sarah Frances Hardy, author and artist
 Jack Harris, local broadcaster from Tampa, Florida
 Herb Jackson, contemporary artist
 Laeta Kalogridis, screenwriter and film producer
 Todd Kimsey, actor
 Stephen Andrew Lynch, film pioneer
 Jana Mashonee Sampson, Grammy Award-winning singer
 John Howell Morrison, composer
 Harry Pickens, pianist
 Sudeep Sen, poet
 Clint Smith, writer for The Atlantic
 John Starling (musician), bluegrass musician
 Lester Strong, Emmy Award-winning journalist
 Nelson Sullivan, videographer and gay rights activist
 William R. Trotter, author and historian 
 Kesler Woodward, artist, art historian, and curator
 William Workman, opera singer

Athletics
 Ryan Adeleye, Israeli-American professional soccer player (transferred)
 Peyton Aldridge, basketball player
 Fred Anderson, MLB player (transferred)
 Mik Aoki, Baseball Head Coach of the University of Notre Dame (2011–present)
 Scotty Barr, MLB player
 Everett Booe, baseball player
 Brett Boretti, Baseball Head Coach of the Columbia Lions (2006–present)
 John A. Brewin, college administrator
 De'Mon Brooks, basketball player
 Dougal M. Buie, college baseball coach
 Carl Cashion, baseball player
 Alex Caskey, MLS player with Seattle Sounders FC (2012–2013)
 Lloyd Christenbury, baseball player
 Rufe Clarke, baseball player
 Nik Cochran, professional basketball player
 Jake Cohen, American/Israeli professional basketball player for Maccabi Tel Aviv
 Pat Crawford, MLB player and member of the 1934 World Series St. Louis Cardinals
 Pete Crayton, college football coach
 Bart Creasman, professional soccer player
 Perry Crosswhite, Australian basketball player
 Stephen Curry, NBA player 
 Melissa Grace Farrell Swank (yoga), Wayne Gretzky’s yoga teacher 
 Chris Czerapowicz, basketball player
 Kevin Donnalley, former NFL player
 Tom Dore, college basketball player
 Norman B. Edgerton, college football coach
 Robert Eenhoorn, MLB player
 Bruce Elder, basketball player
 Bill Fetzer, college baseball, basketball, and football coach
 Buck Flowers, football player
 Robyn Fralick, basketball coach
 Alex Gibbs, Assistant Head Coach of the Houston Texans (2008–10)
 Conor Grace, basketball player
 Kellan Grady, basketball player
 H. M. Grey, college football coach and player
 Jón Axel Guðmundsson, basketball player
 Jordan Hill (soccer), soccer player
 Fred Hetzel, NBA basketball player (1965–71)
 Terry Holland, basketball coach at Davidson (1969–74), University of Virginia (1974–90)
 Pete Hughes, Baseball Head Coach of the Oklahoma Sooners (2012–present)
 Oliver Huie, college football coach
 Lee Hyun-jung (basketball), college basketball player
 Fred Johnston, MLB player
 Tyler Kalinoski, basketball player
 Dean Keener, college basketball player, coach, and commentator
 George M. King, college football player
 Rod Knowles, professional basketball player
 Flake Laird, college football, baseball, and basketball coach and player
 Sam Lanford, professional baseball player
 Mike Maloy, ABA and overseas basketball player
 Dick Marlowe, baseball player
 Buck Marrow, baseball player
 Bill Masse, baseball player
 Matt Matheny, Elon basketball coach
 Eric Minkin (born 1950), American-Israeli basketball player
 Paul Nichols, football coach
 Matt Pacifici, soccer player
 Chris Pollard, Baseball Head Coach of Duke University (2012–present)
 Caroline Queen, 2012 USA Olympic whitewater slalom K-1 kayaker
 Charlie Reiter (born 1988), professional soccer player
 Jason Richards, basketball player and college basketball assistant
 Jennifer Roos, women's college basketball coach
 Derek Rucker, Australian basketball player
 Dan Simonds, MLB player
 Dick Snyder, NBA basketball player (1966–79)
 Matt Spear, Davidson soccer coach
 Robert Ukrop, professional soccer player
 Bob Vail, baseball player
 Brandon Williams, basketball player and NBA minor league coach
 Shirley Wilson, football coach
 Brendan Winters, professional basketball player
 William L. Younger, college football coach
 Steve Heckard, former NFL player

Business
 William Appleton, technologist
 James Batten, CEO of Knight-Ridder (1989–95)
 Irwin Belk, Belk businessman (transferred)
 John Belk, head of Belk
 John Chidsey, CEO of Subway (2019–present)
 Clayton Daley, former CFO of The Procter & Gamble Company
 Martin Daniel Eakes, CEO of Center for Responsible Lending (2000–present)
 Francis Henry Fries, textile magnet
 Nelson Z. Graves, developer
 Earl J. Hesterberg, Houston businessman
 Joseph Toy Howell III, real estate executive
 Justin Jenk, investor
 Stephen P. MacMillan, former CEO, President, and chairman of the board of Stryker Corp
 Jean Mauzé, Manhattan banker
 Jacqueline Musiitwa, Ugandan businesswoman
 Lunsford Richardson, inventor of Vicks VapoRub and founder of Vicks
 Jack Wayman, creator of the Consumer Electronics Show

Education
 William Wright Abbot, archivist and historian
 Graham T. Allison, professor at Harvard and author of Essence of Decision (did not graduate)
 Issac Bailey, professor
 Elizabeth Barnes, philosophy professor at the University of Virginia
 Philip Beidler, American literature professor
 Eugene C. Brooks, president of the University of North Carolina
 Roger H. Brown, President at Berklee College of Music (2004–present)
 Jennings Bryant, professor of communication at the University of Alabama
 James H. Daughdrill, Jr., president of Rhodes College
 Charles Till Davis, medieval historian
 Walter Edgar, historian
 Carl Elliott, philosopher
 James M. Farr, President of the University of Florida (1927–28); English language and literature scholar
 Douglas A. Hicks, provost at Colgate University
 Daniel Harvey Hill, Jr., chancellor at North Carolina State University
 Calvin Howell, physicist and professor at Duke University
 Elizabeth Kiss, Warden of the Rhodes Trust, former President of Agnes Scott College
 Guy L. Nesom, writer and botanist
 Paul Marion, President of Tiffin University, Franklin College, and PA Association of Colleges and Universities; Chancellor of State College System of West Virginia; Director of Higher Education, State of Arkansas
 D. G. Martin, university administrator
 Evander Bradley McGilvary, philosopher
 Richard McIlwaine, President of Hampden-Sydney College
 Patrick D. Miller, Old Testament scholar
 William Andrew Moffett, historian and librarian
 John Wilson Moore, biophysicist
 Michael Munger, professor at Duke University
 Amy Oakes, director of the International Relations program at The College of William and Mary
 Harold Douglas Pratt, Jr., ornithologist and bird illustrator
 Julius W. Pratt, historian specializing in foreign relations and imperialism
 James M. Robinson, religion scholar
 Thomas W. Ross, president of the University of North Carolina system
 C. Alphonso Smith, professor
 Glenn Terrell, president of Washington State University
 Sharon Thompson-Schill, psychology professor at the University of Pennsylvania

Law
 R. Stan Baker, federal judge
 Wade Barber, Superior Court Judge in North Carolina (1998–2006)
 Kenneth B. Bell, Justice of the Florida Supreme Court (2003–2008)
 James Edmund Boyd, United States federal judge
 Elizabeth L. Branch, federal judge
 Henry Gaston Bunn, Arkansas Supreme Court Chief Justice
 Armistead Burwell, Associate Justice of the North Carolina Supreme Court (1892–1894)
 Robert Allan Edgar, United States District Court for the Eastern District of Tennessee judge
 Conner Eldridge, US attorney for the United States District Court for the Western District of Arkansas
 Robert C. Ervin, North Carolina judge
 Sam J. Ervin IV, Associate Justice of the North Carolina Supreme Court (2015–present)
 Samuel James Ervin III, son of U.S. Senator Sam Ervin, Judge of the United States Court of Appeals for the Fourth Circuit (1980–99)
 William Eskridge, legal theorist and professor at Yale Law School
 Vic Fleming, judge and teacher in Little Rock, Arkansas
 Vincent Foster, Deputy White House Counsel in the Bill Clinton administration (1993)
 William J. Haynes, II, General Counsel, U.S. Department of Defense
 Karen S. Marston, Assistant US Attorney
 Boyce Ficklen Martin, Jr., Chief Judge Emeritus of the U.S. Court of Appeals for the Sixth Circuit
 Harry Martin, North Carolina Supreme Court justice
 John L. Napier, United States Congressman; Judge, U.S. Court of Federal Claims
 Frank I. Osborne, North Carolina Attorney General
 James Dickson Phillips, Jr., Judge of the United States Court of Appeals for the Fourth Circuit (1978–94)
 Sanford L. Steelman, Jr., North Carolina Court of Appeals judge
 Taylor Hudnall Stukes, South Carolina Supreme Court chief justice
 Alan Z. Thornburg, North Carolina Court of Appeals judge
 William Byrd Traxler, Jr., Chief Judge of the U.S. Court of Appeals for the Fourth Circuit (1998–present)
 Richard Lesley Voorhees, United States federal judge
 William Walter Wilkins, Chief Judge of the U.S. Court of Appeals for the Fourth Circuit (1986–2007)

Medicine 
 Burkey Belser, graphic designer and creator of the nutrition facts label
 Ketan Ramanlal Bulsara, surgeon
 James E. Crowe, immunologist and pediatrician
 Glenn A. Fry, optometrist
 Mark S. George, medical professor
 Richard L. Guerrant, physician
 D. Neil Hayes, oncologist
 Wayne Jonas, director, NIH Office of Alternative Medicine
 Benjamin Lahey, epidemiologist 
 Beaufort Longest, medical professional
 Sallie Permar, pediatrician
 David Resnik, bioethicist
 William Cumming Rose, determined essential amino acids for human nutrition
 Mary T. Martin Sloop, healthcare advocate
 David Talmage, immunologist
James Trussell, PhD, creator of Plan-B Emergency Contraception (Levonorgestrel), emeritus professor of Public and International Affairs at Princeton University
 Porter Paisley Vinson, surgeon at the Mayo Clinic
 Staff Warren, cardiologist

Military
 Fred Borch, United States Army attorney
 William D. Halyburton, Jr., World War II Medal of Honor recipient
 Rufus G. Herring, World War II Medal of Honor recipient
 Samuel Reeves Keesler, World War I pilot
 William Lee J. Lowrance, Confederate Army Colonel, businessman and pastor
 Tom Marshburn, NASA astronaut
 Prescott Prince, Navy captain, rule of law officer who defended Khalid Sheik Mohammed
 Major General Stephen Dodson Ramseur, Confederate Army
 Lieutenant General Jack C. Stultz, Commanding General, United States Army Reserve

Politics (elected office)
 James McNair Baker, Confederate Senator
 Bruce W. Bannister, South Carolina legislator
 John Belk, Mayor of Charlotte (1969–77)
 Risden Tyler Bennett, United States Congressman from North Carolina
 John Dillard Bellamy, United States Congressman from North Carolina (1899–1903)
 Kurt Biedenkopf, Minister-President of Saxony (1990–2002) and President of the German Bundesrat (1999–2000); studied at Davidson 1949–50
 David Blount, Member of the Mississippi Senate (2008–present)
 Josiah Abigail Patterson Campbell, Confederate politician
 Jay Chaudhuri, member of the North Carolina General Assembly
 J. Bayard Clark, United States Congressman from North Carolina
 Dan Clodfelter, Mayor of Charlotte (2014–2015), Member of the North Carolina Senate (1999–2014)
 George Cretekos, Mayor of Clearwater, Florida
 E. McA. Currie, mayor of Charlotte, North Carolina
 Howard Dyer, Mississippi state senator
 John M. Faison, United States Congressman from North Carolina (1911–15)
 Bill Ferguson, member of the Maryland Senate
 Virgil Fludd, member of the Georgia House of Representatives
 Wyche Fowler, U.S. House of Representatives from Georgia (1977-1986), United States Senator from Georgia (1986-1992), and United States Ambassador to Saudi Arabia (1996-2000)
 Stanley H. Fox, North Carolina Assembly member
 Anthony Foxx, Mayor of Charlotte, North Carolina (2009–13) and United States Secretary of Transportation (2013–17)
 David H. Gambrell, United States Senator from Georgia (1971–72) (appointed)
 Robert Broadnax Glenn, Governor of North Carolina
 George W. Gregory, Jr., member of the South Carolina House of Representatives
 Fletcher L. Hartsell, Jr., member of the North Carolina General Assembly
 David N. Henderson, United States Congressman from North Carolina (1961–77)
 Jim Hodges, Governor of South Carolina (1999–2003)
 James Holshouser, Governor of North Carolina (1973–77)
 Max Hyde Jr., member of the South Carolina House of Representatives
 Hinton James, United States Congressman from North Carolina (1930–31)
 Craig Leonard, Canadian politician
 Ed Lindsey, member of the Georgia House of Representatives
 Grier Martin, Member of the North Carolina House of Representatives (2005–present)
 James G. Martin, Governor of North Carolina (1985–93)
 Julie Mayfield, North Carolina state senator
 Larry McDonald, United States Congressman from Georgia (1975–83); died 1983 when the Soviet Union shot down Korean Air Flight 007
 James Dalrymple McIver, member of the North Carolina General Assembly
 E. Blackburn Moore, Speaker of the Virginia House of Delegates (1950–67)
 Greg Murphy, North Carolina Assembly member
 Maston E. O'Neal, Jr., United States Congressman from Georgia (1965–71)
 George Osborne, Member of Parliament (2001–17) and Chancellor of the Exchequer of the United Kingdom (2010–16); studied at Davidson as a Dean Rusk Scholar
 Carl C. Perkins, United States Congressman from Kentucky (1984–93)
 DuBose Porter, chair of the Georgia Democratic Party; former member of the Georgia House of Representatives
 William R. Purcell, member of the North Carolina Assembly
 James Graham Ramsay, Confederate politician
 Paul Renner, member of Florida House of Representatives
 Charlie Rose, United States Congressman from North Carolina (1973–97)
 John Shott, member of the West Virginia House of Delegates
 Jasper K. Smith, member of the Louisiana House of Representatives (1944–48; 1952–64) 
 John Spratt, United States Congressman from South Carolina (1982–2011), former ranking Democrat on the House Budget Committee
 William Francis Stevenson, United States Congressman from South Carolina (1917–33)
 T. Clarence Stone, North Carolina politician
 Mary Verner, Mayor of Spokane, Washington (2007–2012)
 Page Walley, Tennessee State Senator
 Woodrow Wilson, President of the United States and President of Princeton University (transferred)

Public and private service
 Yaroslav Brisiuck, Ukrainian diplomat
 Kenneth L. Brown, US Ambassador to Ghana (1992–95)
 Giorgio Rosso Cicogna, Italian diplomat
 James F. Entwistle, US Ambassador to Nigeria
 John Finklea, EPA administrator
 Vincent W. Foster, Jr., Deputy White House Counsel (1993)
 Wyche Fowler, Jr., United States Senator and Representative from Georgia (1977–93); US Ambassador to Saudi Arabia (1996–2001)
 Margaret Hoover, political commentator
 Parameswaran Iyer, Indian civil servant
 Lorie K. Logan, President and CEO of the Federal Reserve Bank of Dallas
 Lenny McAllister, conservative activist
 John L. McLucas, United States Secretary of the Air Force (1973–75); CEO of MITRE Corporation
 Leonidas L. Polk, agrarian leader
 Eric Rosenbach, United States Department of Defense official 
 Dean Rusk, United States Secretary of State (1961–69)
 Stephen Salyer, President and CEO of Salzburg Global Seminar; former CEO of Public Radio International
 Mark Sandy, former director of the Office of Management and Budget
 Buie Seawell, chief of staff to Gary Hart
 Tony Snow, White House Press Secretary (2006–07), syndicated talk radio host and Fox News Channel pundit
 Michael R. Taylor, FDA administrator
 Ann Tutwiler, agricultural administrator
 William Winkenwerder, Jr., Defense Department official

Religion
 G. Thompson Brown (1921–2014), professor; founder of Honam Theological University and Seminary; missionary
 Charles Cousar, New Testament scholar, author, Professor Emeritus at Columbia Theological Seminary
 Donald A. Crosby, philosopher
 Frances Taylor Gench, Presbyterian minister, New Testament scholar
 Douglas Oldenburg, President Emeritus at Columbia Theological Seminary; moderator of the 210th General Assembly of the Presbyterian Church
 Francis Wilson Price, missionary
 Edward V. Ramage, Presbyterian minister from Alabama
 Holmes Rolston III, professor, theologian, philosopher; 2003 Templeton Prize recipient
 Herbert Spaugh, bishop of the Moravian Church
 J. Rodman Williams, theologian and father of modern Renewal Theology

Writers, journalists, and publishers
 Vereen Bell, journalist and author
 Martin Clark, author
 Patricia Cornwell, author
 William Emerson, civil rights journalist for Newsweek; editor in chief of The Saturday Evening Post; left Davidson early to serve in World War II
 R. S. Gwynn, poet
 Sarah Frances Hardy, artist and author/illustrator, best known for her picture books
 John Hart, Edgar Award-winning author
 Alamgir Hashmi, poet, scholar
 Rebecca Hazelton, poet
 McKendree Long, artist, poet, known as "picture painter of the apocalypse"
 Charlie Lovett, best-selling author
 Hilary Masters, novelist
 Jason McManus, Editor-in-Chief of Time Inc. (1988–94)
 Robert Olmstead, novelist and educator
 Sheri Reynolds, author, playwright
 Steph Post, author
 Sudeep Sen, author
 Clint Smith (Writer), author
 Frank Soos, author, Flannery O'Connor Award for Short Fiction, Alaska State Writer Laureate
 W. Dabney Stuart, poet
 William Styron, author; attended in 1942, left to join the Marines
 Chuck Sudetic, journalist
 Josh Voorhees, reporter for Slate
 Charles Wright, Pulitzer Prize; Bobbitt National Prize for Poetry recipient; chancellor of The Academy of American Poets; American United States Poet Laureate

Current and former faculty
 Frank Albinder
 Dorothy Allison
 Pinckney Benedict
 Jonathan Berkey
 John M. Bevan
 William Bodiford
 James Bumgardner
 George Arthur Buttrick
 Katie Cannon
 Tim Chartier
 Henri Cole
 Maurice Garland Fulton
 Douglas Glover
 Karmella Haynes
 Daniel Harvey Hill
 Laurie Heyer
 David Kaylor
 John Lycan Kirkpatrick
 Arturo Lindsay
 Robert Maier
 Jagoda Marinić
 James G. Martin
 Leemon McHenry
 S. Brooks McLane
 Alfred Mele
 Kenneth Menkhaus
 Mark R. Nemec
 Guy Owen
 Julio Ramirez
 Wilson Gaines Richardson
 Elijah Frink Rockwell
 Lewis Bevens Schenck
 Nirmal Selvamony
 John Bunyan Shearer
 Henry Louis Smith
 Wendy Raymond
 Sheri Reynolds
 Patrick J. Sparrow
 Terese Svoboda
 Rosemarie Tong
 Ken Urban
 Clare Venables
 Russ Warren
 George H. Weems
 Al Young

Presidents of the college

Presidents of Davidson College
 Rev. Robert Hall Morrison (1836–40)
 Rev. Samuel Williamson (1841–54)
 Rev. Drury Lacy, Jr. (1855–60)
 Rev. John Lycan Kirkpatrick (1860–66)
 Rev. George Wilson McPhail (1866–71)
 Prof. John Rennie Blake, Chairman (1871–77)
 Rev. Andrew Dousa Hepburn (1877–85)
 Rev. Luther McKinnon (1885–88)
 Col. William Joseph Martin, acting (1887–88)
 Rev. John Bunyan Shearer (1888–1901)
 Dr. Henry Louis Smith (1901–12)
 Dr. William Joseph Martin, Jr. (1912–29)
 Rev. Walter Lee Lingle (1929–41)
 Dr. John Rood Cunningham (1941–57)
 Prof. Clarence John Pietenpol, acting (1957–58)
 David Grier Martin (1958–68)
 Prof. Frontis W. Johnston, acting (1968)
 Dr. Samuel Reid Spencer, Jr. (1968–83)
 Prof. Frontis W. Johnston, acting (1983–84)
 Dr. John Kuykendall (1984–97)
 Robert F. Vagt (1997–2007)
 Thomas Warren Ross (2007–10)
 Dr. John Kuykendall, acting (2010–11)
 Dr. Carol Quillen (2011–2022)
 Dr. Douglas A. Hicks (2022-present)

References

Davidson College people